Slinger's Day is a British sitcom that aired for two series from 1986 to 1987, made by Thames Television for the ITV network. It was a continuation of Tripper's Day, which had originally come to a natural end after Leonard Rossiter's death, and, despite the overwhelmingly negative response it had drawn from reviewers and a section of the viewing public, was revived this time with Bruce Forsyth as a different character to Rossiter but fulfilling the same role, that of the manager of a London supermarket with largely incompetent staff.

Like Tripper's Day, it was created by Brian Cooke, however, in contrast to the previous series, Cooke only wrote two episodes of the twelve episodes, more than half of them being written by Vince Powell with others being written by Alex Shearer and Sorry! creators Ian Davidson and Peter Vincent, and one episode written by the prolific Andrew Marshall and David Renwick.

Slinger's Day represented Forsyth's only ever situation comedy acting role, and he remained more associated with stand-up routines and gameshows.

Plot
Cecil Slinger (played by Forsyth) is designated by the Supafare supermarket chain as the new manager in the branch that had previously been run by Norman Tripper. Like his predecessor, Slinger is forced to manage a supermarket branch that employs possibly the worst supermarket staff in the world: Mr. Christian (played by Clarkson), the cheerful but naïve assistant manager; Fred (played by Kelly), a lazy, alcoholic and inept security guard; Hardie (played by Bird), the union shop steward; as well as Higgins, Hardie's assistant of sorts (played by Paul), secretary Sylvia (played by Crowther) and the pop tart-like checkout cashier Dottie (played by Licorish).

Fred replaced Alf (played in Tripper's by Gordon Gostelow), and in the second series Sylvia was replaced by Miss Foster (played by Church) and Dottie was replaced by Shirley (played by de Paza).

Cast
The three main actors credited in the opening credits of Tripper's Day (Leonard Rossiter, Pat Ashton and Gordon Gostelow) did not reprise their roles for Slinger's Day, with the Rossiter and Gostelow roles replaced respectively by Bruce Forsyth and David Kelly. Many of the supporting cast of Tripper's Day did reprise their roles for the show, however only Philip Bird and Paul Clarkson appeared in both series of Slinger's Day.

 Bruce Forsyth as Cecil Slinger
 David Kelly as Fred
 Philip Bird as Hardie
 Paul Clarkson as Mr Christian
 Andrew Paul as Higgins (series 1)
 Vicky Licorish as Dottie (series 1)
 Liz Crowther as Sylvia (series 1)
 Suzanne Church as Miss Foster (series 2)
 Jacqueline De Peza as Shirley (series 2)
 Charlie Hawkins as Colin Wilkins (series 2)

Episodes

Series 1 (1986)

Series 2 (1987)

Home media
The complete series of Slinger's Day was released on 23 April 2012.

See also
Check It Out! (Canadian-produced series following the Tripper's/Slinger's format with Don Adams)

References
Mark Lewisohn, BBC Online Comedy Guide/Radio Times Guide to TV Comedy
British TV Online Resources

External links

Slinger's Day at the British TV Online Resources

1980s British sitcoms
1986 British television series debuts
1987 British television series endings
English-language television shows
ITV sitcoms
Television shows produced by Thames Television
Television series by Fremantle (company)
Television shows set in London
Television series set in shops
Television shows shot at Teddington Studios